Anna Hardwick Gayton (1899-1977) was an American Anthropologist, Folklorist and Museum Curator.  Most recognised for her role in "compiling and analyzing Californian Indian mythology", she was elected President of the American Folklore Society in 1950.

Early life and education 
Born in Santa Cruz, California, Gayton was educated at the University of California, Berkeley, receiving a BA degree in 1923 and MA degree in 1924.

For her graduate studies, she completed a Ph.D. in 1928, with a major in anthropology under Alfred L. Kroeber and Robert H. Lowie and a minor in psychology under Edward C. Tolman. Gayton was the first woman to receive a Ph.D in Anthropology from Berkeley. Her dissertation was titled 'The Narcotic Plant Datura in Aboriginal American Culture'.  

As part of her research for her Ph.D. Gayton conducted fieldwork with the Yokuts and Western Mono peoples: she would publish nine essays based upon Yokuts and Mono myth and oral tradition.

During her studies, she also served as an Editorial Assistant to the journal American Anthropologist.  She would again hold this role again between 1932 and 1934 and also held a similar role between 1934 and 1939 with Yale University Publications in Anthropology.

In 1931, she married fellow anthropologist, Leslie Spier.

Folklore 
During the 1930s, Gayton became active in the American Folklore Society (AFS).  She was Reviews Editor of the Journal of American Folklore from 1935 to 1940 and also its Associate Editor from 1940 to 1943.  She would serve as the Chair of the AFS's Committee on Research in Folklore from 1945 to 1948, as Vice President of the AFS in 1947 and then in 1950, as the Society's president.

During this period, Gayton had commenced a study of the Feast of the Holy Spirit among Azorean Portuguese of California, aided by a Guggenheim Fellowship awarded to her in 1947.

She has been hailed as a "pioneer advocate of comparative folklore studies".

Academia and curating 
in 1948, Gayton joined the staff of the Department of Decorative Art at the University of California, Berkeley.  The main focus of her research became Peruvian textiles in the university's collections - work which had been begun by her predecessor in the Department of Decorative Art, Lila M O'Neale.

Gayton continued this research into ancient Peruvian costume as the (unpaid) curator of textiles at Berkeley's Robert H. Lowie Museum of Anthropology (now Phoebe A. Hearst Museum of Anthropology).  She was particularly associated with ancient materials collected by the archaeologists Max and Charlotte Uhle.

Selected publications 
Gayton, Anna Hadwick (1927). The Uhle Collections from Nievería. Berkeley (Calif.): University of California Press. OCLC 882742385.

Gayton, A. H; Kroeber, A. L; Uhle, Max (1927). The Uhle pottery collections from Nazca,. Berkeley, Calif.: University of California Press. OCLC 3096352.

Gayton, A. H. (1935). "Areal Affiliations of California Folktales". American Anthropologist. 37 (4): 582–599. ISSN 0002-7294.

Gayton, A. H. (1942). "English Ballads and Indian Myths". The Journal of American Folklore. 55 (217): 121–125. doi:10.2307/535249. ISSN 0021-8715.

Gayton, A. H. (1945). "Yokuts and Western Mono Social Organization". American Anthropologist. 47 (3): 409–426. ISSN 0002-7294.

Gayton, A. H. (1946). "Culture-Environment Integration: External References in Yokuts Life". Southwestern Journal of Anthropology. 2 (3): 252–268. ISSN 0038-4801.

Gayton, Anna Hadwick (1948). Yokuts and Western mono ethnography /A. H. Gayton. Berkely; Los Angeles: University of California Press. OCLC 600867859.

Gayton, A. H. (1948). "The "Festa da Serreta" at Gustine". Western Folklore. 7 (3): 251–265. doi:10.2307/1497549. ISSN 0043-373X

Gayton, A. H. (1948). "Folklore and Anthropology". Utah Humanities Review. 2: 26–31.

Gayton, A. H. (1951). "Perspectives in Folklore". The Journal of American Folklore. 64 (252): 147–150. doi:10.2307/536632. ISSN 0021-8715.

Gayton, A. H. (1955). "A New Type of Ancient Peruvian Shirt". American Antiquity. 20 (3): 263–270. doi:10.2307/277003. ISSN 0002-7316.

Gayton, A. H. (1961). "Early Paracas Style Textiles From Yauca, Peru". Archaeology. 14 (2): 117–121. ISSN 0003-8113.

Riesenberg, Saul H.; Gayton, A. H. (1952). "Caroline Island Belt Weaving". Southwestern Journal of Anthropology. 8 (3): 342–375. ISSN 0038-4801.

Rogers, Barbara Thrall; Gayton, A. H. (1944). "Twenty-Seven Chukchansi Yokuts Myths". The Journal of American Folklore. 57 (225): 190–207. doi:10.2307/535966. ISSN 0021-8715.

Stumer, Louis M.; Gayton, A. H. (1958). "A Horizontal-Necked Shirt from Marques, Peru". American Antiquity. 24 (2): 181–182. doi:10.2307/277480. ISSN 0002-7316.

References 

1899 births
1977 deaths
American folklorists
Women folklorists
Presidents of the American Folklore Society